Ondřej Mastný (born 8 March 2002) is a Czech footballer who plays as a goalkeeper for NIFL Premiership club Portadown on loan from  side Manchester United.

Career
In 2018, Mastný joined the youth academy of English Premier League side Manchester United.

Mastný started in the 2020–21 EFL Trophy match against Rochdale on 29 September 2020. He kept a clean sheet and won the match on penalties.

On 30 January 2023, he was loaned out to Northern Irish club Portadown until June 2023.

Career statistics

References

External links
Profile at ManUtd.com

2002 births
Association football goalkeepers
Czech expatriate footballers
Czech expatriate sportspeople in England
Czech footballers
Czech Republic youth international footballers
Expatriate footballers in England
Living people